Do Bareh (also Romanized as Dobreh) is a village in Targavar Rural District, Silvaneh District, Urmia County, West Azerbaijan Province, Iran. At the 2006 census, its population was 276, in 41 families.

References 

Populated places in Urmia County